Love and Troubles is a 1958 Italian comedy film directed by Angelo Dorigo.

Plot 
A Don Juan named Roberto woos a young actress of photo novels on the day she is expected to be engaged to the woman he loves, despite the opposition of her family.

Franco, a train attendant, secretly lets her girlfriend, her telephone operator, get on it to be able to see her despite their working hours which do not coincide.

Finally, an ex-prisoner, Paolo, is looking for a job to be able to marry his girlfriend Marisa, whom a trauma has made mute.

Cast
 Marcello Mastroianni - Franco
 Richard Basehart - Paolo Martelli
 Valentina Cortese - Marisa
 Maurizio Arena - Roberto
 Eloisa Cianni - Teresa
 Irène Galter - Lisa
 Umberto Spadaro - Antonio
 Checco Durante - Virgilio Santucci
 Nino Musco - Padre di Teresa
 Silvio Bagolini - Collega di Franco
 Andrea Aureli - Ivo
 Luigi Tosi - Capocantiere
 Liana Ferri - Madre di Teresa e Ivo
 Emma Baron - Signora Renata (as Emma Baron Cerlesi)
 Mario Passante - Un viaggiatore

References

External links

1958 films
1950s Italian-language films
1958 comedy films
Italian black-and-white films
Italian comedy films
1950s Italian films